Divided consciousness is a term coined by Ernest Hilgard to define a psychological state in which one's consciousness is split into distinct components, possibly during hypnosis.

Origin(s) 
The theory of a division of consciousness was touched upon by Carl Jung in 1935 when he stated, "The so-called unity of consciousness is an illusion... we like to think that we are one but we are not."  Ernest Hilgard believed that hypnosis causes a split in awareness and a vivid form of everyday mind splits.   Drawing themes from Pierre Janet, Hilgard viewed hypnosis from this perspective as a willingness to divide the main systems of consciousness into different sectors.  He argued that this split in consciousness can not only help define the state of mind reached during hypnosis, but can also help to define a vast range of psychological issues such as dissociative identity disorder.

In Hilgard's Divided Consciousness Reconsidered, he offers many examples of "dissociated" human behavior. With regard to theory, he does state that it is useful to assign two modes of consciousness, a receptive mode and an active mode—that is, a bimodal consciousness. In other places he mentions the concept of coconsciousness, wherein two or more states of consciousness may be equally receptive or active, as, for example, in some types of dissociative personalities.

Many psychological studies assume a unity of consciousness. Doubt is cast on this assumption by psychophysical studies in normal subjects and those with blindsight showing the simultaneous dissociation of different modes of reporting of a sensation, and by clinical studies of anosognosic patients showing dissociations of awareness of their own states. These and other phenomena are interpreted to imply two kinds of division of consciousness: the separation of phenomenal experience from reflexive consciousness and the non-unity of reflexive consciousness. Reflexive consciousness is taken to be necessary for report and is associated with ‘the self’ as the subject of experience and its own agent of reporting. Reflexive consciousness is operative only when we attend to our own states. When we are involved in the world, reflexivity intervenes less and our consciousness is more unified.

Experimentation 
The theory has been tried and tested and some tests have proven that the theory makes some legitimate predictions.  Others - such as one performed on 169 undergraduate students, some of whom performed tasks in selective attention and divided attention conditions being correlated with scores on the Harvard Group Scale of Hypnotic Susceptibility - refute Hilgard’s findings.

New trends in psychology and cognitive neuroscience suggest that applications of nonlinear dynamics, chaos and self-organization seem to be particularly important for research of some fundamental problems regarding mind-brain relationship. Relevant problems among others are formations of memories during alterations of mental states and the nature of a barrier that divides mental states, and leads to the process called dissociation. This process is related to a formation of groups of neurons which often synchronize their firing patterns in a unique spatial manner. The central theme of this study is the relationship between level of moving and oscillating mental processes and their neurophysiological substrate. This presents a question about principles of organization of the conscious experience and how the experiences happen in the brain. The concept of chaotic self-organization provides a unique theoretical and experimental tool for deeper understanding of dissociative phenomena. It enables people to study how dissociative phenomena can be linked to epileptiform discharges, which are related to various forms of psychological and somatic manifestations. Organizing principles that constitute human consciousness and other mental phenomena from this point of view may be described by analysis and reconstruction of underlying dynamics of psychophysiological measures.

See also 
 Split-brain
 Alien hand syndrome
 Dual consciousness
 Bicameral mentality
 Left brain interpreter
 Lateralization of brain function
 Society of Mind
 Parallel computing
 Laterality
 Mind-body problem
 Philosophy of mind
 Theory of mind
 Ouija
 Dowsing
 Automatic writing
 Ideomotor phenomenon
 Tulpa
 Cognitive Neuroscience
 Identity (philosophy)
 Open individualism
 Vertiginous question

References 

Hypnosis
Consciousness
Consciousness studies
Dichotomies
Mind–body problem
Mental states
Psychological theories
Neurological disorders
Neuropsychology
Neuroscience